Adam Brinley Woodyatt (born 28 June 1968) is an English actor. He is known for his role as Ian Beale in the BBC soap opera EastEnders, which he played between 1985 and 2022.

Early life and education
Woodyatt was born on 28 June 1968 in Walthamstow, and grew up in east London. He was educated at two independent schools:  Forest School, on the edge of Epping Forest, in Walthamstow in north east London, where he shared classes with comedy writer Sharat Sardana and cricket captain Nasser Hussain; and the Sylvia Young Theatre School. He also attended Llanidloes High School, Llanidloes, Wales.

Career
Aged 13, Woodyatt appeared on stage at the National Theatre in Tom Stoppard's play On the Razzle. Following the completion of his studies at the Sylvia Young Theatre School, Woodyatt appeared in the BBC's children's drama series The Baker Street Boys (1983). He then put his acting career on hiatus and worked as a butcher in Wales for a brief period, before joining the cast of BBC soap opera EastEnders. Not expecting to stay much beyond the first year, Woodyatt has become the longest-serving male cast member in EastEnders. In 2013, his longevity was honoured at the British Soap Awards, where he received a Lifetime Achievement Award for his portrayal of Ian Beale.

Woodyatt has also appeared as a guest personality on several BBC game shows and charity fundraisers, including A Question of Sport, Robot Wars (winning the show's Celebrity Special with the robot Pussycat) and Children in Need. In 2015, Woodyatt played the henchman of the Wicked Queen in a pantomime production of Snow White at Swindon’s Wyvern Theatre. Speaking about joining the production, Woodyatt commented: "I absolutely love performing in front of an audience as it’s so different to camera – I love the reaction of the audience. I am very much looking forward to spending the Christmas season at the Wyvern Theatre, which I know has a reputation for staging outstanding pantomimes."

On 24 April 2015, the comedy singer Gavin Osborn released a song titled "Adam Woodyatt", with the lines "Imagine how it feels, being Ian Beale". In 2019, he appeared on Celebrity Masterchef.

In August 2020, it was announced Woodyatt would be taking an "extended break" from appearing in EastEnders. In 2022, he made a brief return for the funeral of Dot Branning (June Brown).

In November 2021, Woodyatt was announced as one of the two annual late entrants during the twenty-first series of I'm a Celebrity...Get Me Out of Here!, entering alongside Coronation Street actor Simon Gregson. He was eliminated on day 18 from Gwrych Castle (hosting its second season) in Wales on 10 December 2021, finishing in sixth place. 

Woodyatt is also a photographer, a hobby he took up while performing On The Razzle at the National Theatre when he was 13 years old.

In 2008, he won the Architectural Photographer of the Year Award of The Societies of Photographers with a picture he took at St Pancras, where he was filming EastEnders.

Personal life
On 8 April 1998, Woodyatt married dancer Beverley Sharp in a private ceremony at Disney World, Florida. The couple have two children, and for many years lived in Southam, Warwickshire, some 72 miles northwest of the BBC Elstree Studios in south Hertfordshire, where EastEnders is recorded. On 21 August 2020, it was revealed that Woodyatt had decided to separate from Sharp the previous year, after more than twenty years of marriage. Woodyatt is a supporter of Liverpool F.C. and has been described by Digital Spy as a "huge sci-fi fanatic".

Charity
Inspired by his father's death from cancer aged 58, Woodyatt has helped raise money for various cancer research initiatives, and broke his collarbone in June 2003 whilst training for a charity bicycle ride.

Woodyatt was also involved in launching an Aid for Haiti event at Coventry's Ricoh Arena in February 2010, with many of his actor colleagues posing for photographs, signing autographs, and providing items for an auction, which raised £30,000. Woodyatt is also a supporter of Warwickshire & Northamptonshire Air Ambulance and an Ambassador for the Children's Air Ambulance.

In January 2019, it was announced that he would be running the London Marathon with some of his EastEnders co-stars for a Dementia campaign in honour of former Eastenders actress Barbara Windsor.

Filmography

Television

Theatre
 Aladdin
 Mother Goose
 Cinderella
 Oliver
 Snow White and the Seven Dwarfs
 Looking Good Dead (2021-2022)
 My Fair Lady (2022-2023)

Television appearances
 Ant & Dec's Saturday Night Takeaway
 Children in Need
 Dick & Dom in da Bungalow
 Dreamhouse
 The Kumars at No. 42
 National Lottery
 Noel's House Party
 A Question of Sport
 Ready Steady Cook
 Robot Wars
 Celebrity Mastermind
 Family Fortunes
 Would I Lie to You
 Strictly Come Dancing
 Motormouth
 They Think It's All Over
 The Weakest Link
 School's Out
 All Round to Mrs. Brown's
 I'm a Celebrity...Get Me Out of Here! (Series 21)
 Queens for the Night

References

External links
 
 

1968 births
Living people
Alumni of the Sylvia Young Theatre School
English male soap opera actors
English male stage actors
I'm a Celebrity...Get Me Out of Here! (British TV series) participants
Male actors from London
People educated at Forest School, Walthamstow
People educated at Llanidloes High School
People from Walthamstow
Photographers from London